Nels Smith may refer to:

 Nels H. Smith (1884–1976), American politician, governor of Wyoming
 Nels J. Smith (born 1939), his grandson, American politician in Wyoming